Gabriel Niell (29 July 1941 – 31 March 2013) was an Argentine cyclist. He competed in the team time trial at the 1960 Summer Olympics.

References

External links
 

1941 births
2013 deaths
Argentine male cyclists
Olympic cyclists of Argentina
Cyclists at the 1960 Summer Olympics
Cyclists from Buenos Aires